In probability theory, Lévy’s continuity theorem, or Lévy's convergence theorem, named after the French mathematician Paul Lévy, connects convergence in distribution of the sequence of random variables with pointwise convergence of their characteristic functions. 
This theorem is the basis for one approach to prove the central limit theorem and it is one of the major theorems concerning characteristic functions.

Statement

Suppose we have

If the sequence of characteristic functions converges pointwise to some function 

then the following statements become equivalent:

Proof 
Rigorous proofs of this theorem are available.

References

Probability theorems
Theorems in statistics
Paul Lévy (mathematician)